A number of Motor Vessels have been named MV Aurora, including -
 - an American tanker torpedoed and damaged in 1942
 - a German cruise ship/ocean liner.
 - a ferry in the Alaska Marine Highway
 - a cruise ship operated by P&O Cruises

See also
 - a number of steamships with this name

Ship names